The Iris Tribute Award is an annual award presented by Québec Cinéma, as part of its Prix Iris program, as a lifetime achievement award for distinguished accomplishments in the Cinema of Quebec.

Until 2016, it was known as the Jutra Hommage, presented as part of the Jutra Awards. It was renamed from Jutra to Iris, alongside the entire Prix Iris program, when Québec Cinéma stripped the name of film director Claude Jutra from its awards program in 2016. The Prix Iris name was announced in October 2016.

Recipients
 1999 (1st Jutra Awards) — Marcel Sabourin
 2000 (2nd Jutra Awards) — Frédéric Back
 2001 (3rd Jutra Awards) — Gilles Carle
 2002 (4th Jutra Awards) — Anne Claire Poirier
 2003 (5th Jutra Awards) — Rock Demers
 2004 (6th Jutra Awards) — Richard Grégoire
 2005 (7th Jutra Awards) — Michel Brault
 2006 (8th Jutra Awards) — Denise Filiatrault
 2007 (9th Jutra Awards) — Pierre Curzi
 2008 (10th Jutra Awards) — Jean-Claude Labrecque
 2009 (11th Jutra Awards) — Fernand Dansereau
 2010 (12th Jutra Awards) — René Malo
 2011 (13th Jutra Awards) — Jean Lapointe
 2012 (14th Jutra Awards) — Paule Baillargeon
 2013 (15th Jutra Awards) — Michel Côté
 2014 (16th Jutra Awards) — Micheline Lanctôt
 2015 (17th Jutra Awards) — André Melançon
 2016 (18th Quebec Cinema Awards) — François Dompierre
 2017 (19th Quebec Cinema Awards) — Lyse Lafontaine
 2018 (20th Quebec Cinema Awards) — André Forcier
 2019 (21st Quebec Cinema Awards) — Pierre Mignot
 2020 (22nd Quebec Cinema Awards) — Alanis Obomsawin
 2021 (23rd Quebec Cinema Awards) — Association coopérative de productions audio-visuelles (ACPAV)
 2022 (24th Quebec Cinema Awards) — Louise Portal

References

Awards established in 1999
Tribute
Quebec-related lists
Lifetime achievement awards
1999 establishments in Canada